VNU University of Social Sciences and Humanities (Vietnamese: Trường Đại học Khoa học Xã hội và Nhân văn, Đại học Quốc gia Hà Nội), abbreviated as VNU-USSH, is a major research university in Hanoi, Vietnam, and a member university of Vietnam National University, Hanoi.

History 
In October 1945, President Hồ Chí Minh signed the decree to establish University of Literature (Ban Đại học Văn khoa, or Trường Đại học Văn khoa) - the precursor of the current VNU-USSH. In April 1956, University of Hanoi (Trường Đại học Tổng hợp Hà Nội) was established. During this period, fundamental foundation for the disciplines of social sciences and humanities as well as the university's tradition and reputation were laid.

In September 1995, the VNU University of Social Sciences and Humanities (formerly College of Social Sciences and Humanities) was established on the basis of social sciences and humanities from University of Hanoi, and became an official member of Vietnam National University, Hanoi (VNU) - the country's leading comprehensive and most prestigious training and research center.

Rectors (1995 - present)

Programs

Undergraduate programs

Graduate programs

Master's Programs

Doctoral programs

School, Faculties and Division 
School of Journalism and Communication
Faculty of Anthropology
Faculty of Archives and Office Management
Faculty of History
Faculty of Information and Library Science
Faculty of International Studies
Faculty of Linguistics
Faculty of Literature
Faculty of Management Science
Faculty of Oriental Studies
Faculty of Philosophy
Faculty of Political Science
Faculty of Psychology
Faculty of Sociology
Faculty of Tourism
Faculty of Vietnamese Studies and Language
Division of Religious Studies

Institute, Museum and Centers 
Institute for Policy and Management
Museum of Anthropology
Center for applied information Technology and Training
Center for Arts and Culture Studies and Application
Center for Asian-Pacific Area Studies and International Relations
Center for Assisting and Consulting Psychology
Center for Chinese Studies
Center for Contemporary Religious Studies
Center for Education Quality Assurance
Center for Foreign Languages and Educational Cooperation
Center for Gender, Population, Environment and Social Affairs
Center for Information Technology training and application
Center for Vietnamese Language and Culture
Hanoi Sejong Center for Korean language
Research Center for the Development of Minorities in Mountainous Regions and the Red River Basin

Administrative Offices 
Office for Academic Affairs
Office for Cooperation and Development
Office for General Administration
Office for Graduate Affairs
Office for Inspection and Legal Affairs
Office for Personnel Affairs
Office for Planning and Finance
Office for Politics and Student Affairs
Office for Research Affairs
Journal of Social Sciences and Humanities

Notable people 
For over 70 years, the university has represented the convergence of intellectuals such as President Hồ Chí Minh, Prime Minister Phạm Văn Đồng, General Võ Nguyên Giáp, erudite scholars including professors Đặng Thai Mai, Trần Văn Giàu, Đào Duy Anh, Cao Xuân Huy, Trần Đức Thảo, Đinh Gia Khánh, Đinh Xuân Lâm, Hà Minh Đức, Hà Văn Tấn, Hoàng Như Mai, Hoàng Xuân Nhị, Lê Đình Kỵ, Lê Văn Lan, Nguyễn Tài Cẩn, Phan Cự Đệ, Phan Huy Lê, Trần Đình Hượu, Trần Quốc Vượng and generations of eminent academics who have founded and developed the social sciences and humanities in the country, and brought international fame to Vietnam.

VNU-USSH has educated and hosted many prominent modern Vietnamese politicians, including: General Secretary - President Nguyễn Phú Trọng, Secretary Phạm Quang Nghị,...

References 

Universities in Vietnam
Vietnam National University, Hanoi
Educational institutions established in the 1940s
Education in Hanoi